Hypsopygia tripartitalis is a species of snout moth in the genus Hypsopygia. It is found in Cuba.

References

Moths described in 1871
Pyralini
Endemic fauna of Cuba